Dennes Point is a semi-rural locality in the local government area (LGA) of Kingborough in the Hobart LGA region of Tasmania. The 2016 census has a population of 49 for the state suburb of Dennes Point.
It is also a geographical feature and a small hamlet at the northern tip of Bruny Island.

History 

Dennes Point was gazetted as a locality in 1967.
It is named after the Denne family who first settled the area as farmers around the 1830s, although it was known as Kelly's Point up to the 1840s, being named after pioneer shipmaster and harbour pilot James Kelly.  Anthony Smith Denne commenced a regular ferry service in 1847 across the D'Entrecasteaux Channel between Tinderbox and "Kelly's" Point, although the island is now serviced by a vehicular ferry between Kettering and Roberts Point.  Over the years Dennes Point has seen mixed agricultural activity, mostly orcharding and light grazing.

Its post office opened on 20 August 1941 and closed in 1984.

Geography
The shore of the D’Entrecasteaux Channel forms the western boundary.

Road infrastructure 

Route C625 (Nebraska Road / Bruny Island Main Road) passes through from south to east.

References

Colonial Times Newspaper, Hobart, Tasmania, 12 March & 2 April 1847.
Cox, Ships in Tasmanian Waters, 1971.

Towns in Tasmania
Southern Tasmania
Bruny Island
Localities of Kingborough Council